Chesnokovo is a rural locality (a village) in Andreyevskoye Rural Settlement, Vashkinsky District, Vologda Oblast, Russia. The population was 3 as of 2002.

Geography 
Chesnokovo is located 19 km northwest of Lipin Bor (the district's administrative centre) by road. Filimonovo is the nearest rural locality.

References 

Rural localities in Vashkinsky District